Selina Tusitala Marsh  (born 21 April 1971) is a New Zealand poet and academic, and was the New Zealand Poet Laureate for 2017–2019.

Early life
Marsh was born in 1971 in Auckland, New Zealand. Through her mother, Sailigi Tusitala, Marsh is of Samoan and Tuvaluan ancestry and through her father James Crosbie she is of English, Scottish and French descent.

Career

Marsh grew up in Avondale, Auckland, New Zealand and resides on Waiheke Island. She gained her doctorate from the University of Auckland in 2004 after completing her thesis titled "Ancient banyans, flying foxes and white ginger": five Pacific women writers. Marsh is a Professor in the English, Drama and Writing Studies Department at the University of Auckland where she teaches Creative Writing, and Pacific Literature.

Marsh has edited the Pasifika poetry section of the New Zealand Electronic Poetry Centre.  

In 2015 Marsh won the Literary Death Match for poets at the Australia and New Zealand Literary Festival in London.

In 2016, Marsh composed and performed the poem "Unity" for Queen Elizabeth II at Westminster Abbey on Commonwealth Day Observance.  

In August 2017 Marsh was named the New Zealand Poet Laureate for 2017–2019. Her collection, Tightrope, also made the long-list for the Ockham New Zealand Book Awards for Best Book of Poetry 2018.

In the 2019 New Year Honours, Marsh was appointed an Officer of the New Zealand Order of Merit, for services to poetry, literature and the Pacific community. In 2019, she was elected a Fellow of the Royal Society of New Zealand.

In August 2020 her book Mophead was the supreme winner at the New Zealand Book Awards for Children and Young Adults, and also won the Margaret Mahy Book of the Year and Elsie Locke Award for Non-fiction. In October 2020 Mophead won three awards at the Publishers Association of New Zealand Book Design Awards – the Gerard Reid Award for Best Book, Best children's book and the PANZ People’s Choice Award – recognising the design skills of Vida Kelly. Her 2020 book, Mophead Tu, was shortlisted for the Elsie Locke Award for Nonfiction at the 2021 New Zealand Book Awards for Children and Young Adults.

Poetry by Marsh was included in UPU, a curation of Pacific Island writers’ work which was first presented at the Silo Theatre as part of the Auckland Arts Festival in March 2020. UPU was remounted as part of the Kia Mau Festival in Wellington in June 2021.

Bibliography 
Niu Voices: Contemporary Pacific Fiction 1 (Wellington: Huia Publishers, 2006)
 Fast Talking PI (Auckland: Auckland University Press, 2009)
 Dark Sparring (Auckland: Auckland University Press, 2013)
 Tightrope (Auckland: Auckland University Press, 2017)
Mophead: How Your Difference Makes a Difference (Auckland: Auckland University Press, 2019)
Mophead Tu: The Queen’s Poem (Auckland: Auckland University Press, 2020)

References

External links
Official website

1971 births
Living people
New Zealand women poets
New Zealand Poets Laureate
21st-century New Zealand poets
21st-century New Zealand women writers
People from Auckland
Officers of the New Zealand Order of Merit
New Zealand people of Samoan descent
New Zealand people of Tuvaluan descent
New Zealand people of English descent
New Zealand people of Scottish descent
New Zealand people of French descent
University of Auckland alumni
Academic staff of the University of Auckland
Fellows of the Royal Society of New Zealand